John Macpherson Ferguson (1783–1855) was a Scot serving in the Royal Navy during the Napoleonic Wars, mainly in command of HMS Mersey, who rose to the rank of Rear Admiral.

Life

He was born at Argyle Square in Edinburgh on 15 August 1784 the son of Adam Ferguson and his wife, Catherine Burnett. The family moved to South Castle Street (just off Princes Street) soon after the street was built (around 1792).

In 1804 he was commissioned as a lieutenant in the Royal Navy in the midst of the Napoleonic Wars. In October 1810 he was given his first command: the relatively new, 18-gun HMS Pandora, replacing Commander Richard Janverin. On Pandora, on New Year's Eve 1810/11, he captured the French privateer Chasseur. The 16-gun Chasseur threw her cannon overboard before capture but the ship and crew of 36 came under Ferguson's control. On 13 February 1811, the Pandora was wrecked in a storm on the Kattegat off the coast of Jutland (modern day Denmark). Although 27 (or 29) of the crew of 121 were drowned, Ferguson was amongst the survivors. The survivors huddled in the wrecked hull until February 15 when a Danish ship came to their rescue, but, Denmark being sided against Britain at the time, Ferguson and his crew were taken prisoner. In March, after the Battle of Anholt, in which the British captured a large number of Danish prisoners, Captain Joseph Baker of  proposed taking his Danish prisoners to Randers and exchanging them for the officers and crew of Pandora. When Ferguson returned to England the court martial for the loss of Pandora severely reprimanded him as well as the pilot, William Famie, for their failure to take frequent depth soundings and for carrying too little sail.

He spent a period with no command, probably due to some blame attaching him for losing the Pandora and his capture. In August 1815 he replaced Commander George Hilton as commander of HMS Nimrod. The Nimrod was war-hardened both against the French and in North America, but the world was entering a period of peace. His service on Nimrod was mainly on the British coast, based in Portsmouth and Leith.

On 1 January 1817 he was promoted to captain but with no command.

In April 1823 he took command of HMS Mersey which had undergone a two-year refit, having last been under command of George Collier. He saw service off the coast of South America.

He was raised to the rank of rear admiral.

Ferguson died on 5 June 1855 and is buried next to his brother in an enclosed vault within the sealed "Covenanters Prison" section of Greyfriars Kirkyard next to his great uncle Joseph Black.

Family

In 1836 Ferguson married Elizabeth Lauder Guild (1812-1894), almost thirty years his junior. After his death "Mrs Admiral Ferguson" is listed as living at 2 Eton Terrace in Edinburgh's West End. Their only son, Cpt Adam Ferguson (1836–1865), served with the 42nd Highlanders (Black Watch).

His brother was Sir Adam Ferguson. His great uncle was Joseph Black.

References
 

1783 births
1855 deaths
Military personnel from Edinburgh
Royal Navy rear admirals
Burials at Greyfriars Kirkyard
Shipwreck survivors
Royal Navy personnel of the Napoleonic Wars